Oliver A. Horn (June 22, 1901 – October 10, 1960) was an American water polo player who competed in the 1924 Summer Olympics. He was born in St. Louis, Missouri. In 1924 he won the bronze medal with the American water polo team. He played all five matches.

See also
 List of Olympic medalists in water polo (men)

References

External links
 

1901 births
1960 deaths
American male water polo players
Water polo players at the 1924 Summer Olympics
Olympic bronze medalists for the United States in water polo
Medalists at the 1924 Summer Olympics